The International Journal of Information Technology & Decision Making was founded in 2002 and is published by World Scientific. It is a peer-reviewed scientific journal covering the application of information technology to decision-making, in areas such as bio-informatics, fuzzy logic, neural networks, and online business. The current editor-in-chief is Yong Shi (College of Information Science and Technology, University of Nebraska, and CAS Research Center on Fictitious Economy & Data Science, Chinese Academy of Sciences).

Abstracting and indexing 
The journal is abstracted and indexed in Science Citation Index Expanded, CompuMath Citation Index, and Inspec.

External links 
 

World Scientific academic journals
Publications established in 2002
English-language journals
Computer science journals
2002 establishments in Singapore